Dyrdahl is a surname that may refer to 

Arnold Dyrdahl (1919–1973), Norwegian bobsledder athlete
Bjørn Dyrdahl (born 1949), Norwegian luger athlete 
Bryan Dyrdahl, American snowmobile racer athlete
Joachim Dyrdahl, Norwegian disc jockey and record producer, whose stage name is Diskjokke
Melissa Dyrdahl (born 1957), chief executive officer of Bring Light, based in Cupertino, California